Gubernatorial elections were held in the Philippines on May 9, 2022. All provinces will elect their provincial governors for three-year terms, who will be inaugurated on June 30, 2022 after their proclamation. Governors that are currently serving their third consecutive terms are prohibited from running as governors (they may run for any other posts however).

Highly urbanized cities and independent component cities such as Baguio, Cebu City and Davao City and Metro Manila with the municipality of Pateros are outside the jurisdiction of any province and thus do not run elections for governors of their mother provinces (Benguet, Cebu and Davao del Sur respectively). These cities and Pateros elect mayors instead.

Summary

Luzon

Incumbents are expressed in italics.

Ilocos Region

Ilocos Norte
Incumbent Governor Matthew Manotoc is running for reelection; his primary opponent is former congressman Rodolfo Fariñas.

Ilocos Sur
Incumbent Governor Ryan Luis Singson is term-limited, and will be running for Vice Governor. His wife, Patricia Savellano-Singson, was supposed to be running in his place, but withdrew her candidacy on October 11, leaving the governor's uncle and incumbent Vice Governor, Jerry Singson, running unopposed.

La Union
Incumbent Governor Francisco Emmanuel Ortega III is supposed to run for reelection. On November 11, he withdrew from the race to run for mayor of San Fernando and was replaced by his daughter, Raphaelle Ortega-David.

Pangasinan
Incumbent Governor Amado Espino III is running for reelection. He will be running against incumbent 5th District representative Ramon Guico III.

Cagayan Valley

Batanes
Incumbent Governor Marilou Cayco is running for reelection.

Cagayan
Incumbent Governor Manuel Mamba is running for reelection. He will be running against Zarah Lara, the wife of incumbent 3rd District representative Joseph Lara.

Isabela
Incumbent Governor Rodolfo Albano III is running for reelection. He will be running against Gloria Almazan and Romeo Carlos.

Nueva Vizcaya
Incumbent Governor Carlos Padilla is running for reelection against Incumbent Vice Governor Jose Tomas Jr.

Quirino
Incumbent Governor Dakila Cua is running for reelection against former Nagtipunan Mayor Rosario Camma.

Cordillera Administrative Region

Abra
Incumbent Governor Maria Jocelyn Bernos will be running for Vice Governor. Her party nominated her father, incumbent Bangued, Abra Mayor Dominic Valera. His main opponents will be Derdrei Roce Luna-Ifurung, daughter of former Congresswoman Cecilia Seares-Luna and former Governor Eustaquio Bersamin.

Apayao
Congressman Elias Bulut Jr. is aiming to switch places with his sister Governor Eleonor Bulut Begtang.

Benguet
Incumbent Governor Melchor Diclas is running for reelection.

Ifugao
Incumbent Governor Jerry Dalipog is running for reelection.

Kalinga
Incumbent Governor Ferdinand Tubban is running for reelection against former Vice Governor James Edduba. Tubban defeated Edduba by ten votes in 2019.

Mountain Province
Incumbent Governor Bonifacio Lacwasan is running for reelection against Albert Paday-os.

Central Luzon

Aurora
Incumbent Governor Edgardo Noveras is term-limited. He is running for Vice Governor swapping together with his son Incumbent Vice Governor Christian Noveras running against former board member Isidro Galban for province's governorship.

Bataan
Incumbent Governor Albert Garcia is term-limited and will instead be running for 2nd District Representative. His brother, 2nd District representative Joet Garcia will be running in his stead and is unopposed.

Bulacan
Governor Daniel Fernando is going up against Vice Governor Wilhelmino Sy-Alvarado.

Nueva Ecija
Incumbent Governor Aurelio Umali is running for reelection against Palayan Mayor Adrianne Mae Cuevas.

Pampanga
Incumbent Dennis Pineda is going up against Danilo Baylon, the former mayor of Candaba who is said to have received an order from God for him to run.

Tarlac

Zambales
Governor Hermogenes Ebdane is seeking a second consecutive term. His main opponent is 2nd District Representative Atty. Cheryl P. Deloso-Montalla.

Calabarzon

Batangas
Incumbent Hermilando Mandanas is running for his third and final term. His opponents are Praxedes Bustamante and former Padre Garcia mayor Prudencio Gutierrez.

On April 22, gubernatorial aspirant and former vice governor Richard Recto withdrew his candidacy.

Cavite
Governor Jonvic Remulla is seeking his second consecutive term.

Remulla was re-elected; his running-mate, Athena Tolentino, was elected vice governor.

Laguna
Governor Ramil Hernandez is going up against outgoing congresswoman Sol Aragones.

Quezon
Governor Danilo Suarez is going up against outgoing congresswoman Angelina Tan.

Angelina Tan was elected, becoming the first woman governor of the province.

Rizal
Incumbent Governor Rebecca Ynares is term limited. Her husband, former governor Casimiro Ynares Jr. was supposed to run in her place, but later substituted by her daughter, GSIS Board of Trustee Nina Ricci Ynares on November 15.

Mimaropa

Marinduque
Incumbent Governor Presbitero Velasco will run for reelection. His opponents are Vice Governor Romulo Bacorro and national chairman emeritus of the League of Barangays in the Philippines James Marty Lim.

Occidental Mindoro
Incumbent Governor Eduardo Gadiano secured his post against incumbent Congresswoman Josephine Ramirez-Sato.

Oriental Mindoro
Governor Humerlito Dolor is going up against outgoing congressman Salvador Leachon.

Dolor was re-elected.

Palawan
Jose Alvarez is term-limited and is running for congressman from Palawan's 2nd congressional district under PDP–Laban. That party is not running candidates for governor, but the local party he founded, Partidong Pagbabago ng Palawan, is fielding in former congressman Dennis Victor Socrates.

Romblon
Governor Jose Riano is going up against former congressman Eduardo Firmalo.

Bicol Region

Albay
Governor Al Francis Bichara is going up against Legazpi mayor Noel Rosal.

Camarines Norte

Camarines Sur
Incumbent governor Miguel Luis Villafuerte is term-limited and is running for congressman. His younger brother Vincenzo (his party's nominee), congressman Rolando Andaya Jr. and vice governor Imelda Papin are the major candidates for the open seat.

Catanduanes

Masbate

Sorsogon
Incumbent Francis Escudero is running for senator. His party nominated incumbent Casiguran mayor Boboy Hamor for governor.

Visayas

Incumbents are expressed in italics.

Western Visayas

Aklan
Governor Florencio Miraflores is term-limited and is retiring from politics. His son, Ibajay mayor Jose Enrique, is his party's candidate.

Antique
Governor Rhodora Cadiao is eyeing reelection.

Capiz
Governor Esteban Evan Contreras is going up against congressman Fredenil Castro.

Guimaras
Governor Samuel Gumarin is term-limited and is running for mayor of Buenavista. His party, PDP–Laban, did not name a nominee for the governorship. Meanwhile, former congressman Joaquin Carlos Nava is running as candidate of the National Unity Party.

Iloilo
Governor Arthur Defensor Jr. is eyeing reelection.

Negros Occidental
Governor Eugenio Jose Lacson is eyeing reelection.

Central Visayas

Bohol
Governor Arthur Yap is going up against congressman Erico Aristotle Aumentado after Leoncio Evasco Jr. declined to challenge Yap who had beaten him in 2019.

Cebu
Governor Gwendolyn Garcia is going up against former Tourism Secretary Ace Durano.

Negros Oriental
Governor Roel Degamo is going up against vice governor Edward Mark Macias and Bayawan mayor Pryde Henry Teves. Degamo was allowed by the COMELEC to seek re-election despite completing three consecutive terms. On his defense, Degamo claimed that his three terms in office were interrupted a number of times following suspension and dismissal orders by the Office of the Ombudsman over cases of intelligence and calamity fund use filed against him.

On December 16, 2021, the Commission on Elections (Second Division), through a resolution, declared Grego Gaudia as a nuisance candidate and cancelled his candidacy, citing that he used the name "Ruel Degamo", which later appeared in the ballots, to confuse the voters. He later filed a motion for reconsideration, allowing him to run; but it was denied by the COMELEC en banc on September 1, 2022. With the commission finalizing its decision on Gaudia and crediting his votes to Degamo, on October 3, Degamo was proclaimed as the elected candidate.

Siquijor
Governor Zaldy Villa is term-limited and is running for congressman. His local party Partidong Siquijor nominated his son, congressman Jake Vincent Villa. His opponent is Larena mayor Dean Villa.

Eastern Visayas

Biliran
Governor Rogelio Espina originally filed his candidacy to defend the governorship. However, he withdrew and was replaced by his son, Naval mayor Gerard Espina.

Eastern Samar
Governor Ben Evardone is eyeing reelection.

Leyte
Governor Leopoldo Dominico Petilla is term-limited, having served three terms since 2013. His older brother, former governor and Energy Secretary Jericho Petilla, is running in his stead.

Northern Samar

Samar
Incumbent Reynolds Michael Tan who assumed office after the death of former governor Milagrosa Tan is running for congressman. His sister, incumbent congresswoman Sharee Ann Tan is running in his place. Santa Margarita mayor Gemma Zosa is her opponent.

Southern Leyte

Mindanao

Incumbents are expressed in italics.

Zamboanga Peninsula

Zamboanga del Norte
Governor Roberto Uy is term-limited and is running for mayor of Dapitan. His party, PDP–Laban, nominated his wife and former Dipolog mayor Evelyn Uy. Her primary opponent is Dapitan mayor Rosalina Jalosjos.

Zamboanga del Sur
Governor Victor Yu is eyeing for reelection. His primary opponents include former 2nd district congresswoman and 2019 gubernatorial challenger Aurora Enerio-Cerilles, and former Dumingag mayor Jun Pacalioga.

Zamboanga Sibugay
Governor Wilter Palma is term-limited and is running for congressman from the 1st district. His son, 1st district congressman Wilter II was nominated by his party for the open position. His primary opponent is congresswoman from the 2nd district Dulce Ann Hofer.

Northern Mindanao

Bukidnon
Incumbent Governor Jose Maria Zubiri Jr. is term-limited, and will be running for Representative of 3rd District. His son, Manuel, will run in his place against 4th District Representative Rogelio Neil Roque.

Camiguin
Governor Jurdin Jesus Romualdo is running for congressman. His party nominated his son term-limited congressman Xavier Jesus as their candidate.

Lanao del Norte
Governor Imelda Dimaporo is eyeing reelection.

Misamis Occidental

Misamis Oriental
Governor Yevgeny Emano is term-limited. He is running for congressman from the 2nd district. His Padayon Pilipino local party did not name a candidate for governor but instead supported Gingoog vice mayor Peter Unabia as their gubernatorial candidate. Unabia's opponents for the position are Cagayan de Oro mayor and former governor Oscar Moreno and 2nd district congresswoman Juliette Uy.

Davao Region

Davao de Oro
Governor Tyron Uy was the original candidate of the Hugpong ng Pagbabago, but withdrew in favor of his father, Davao de Oro Provincial Board member Arturo Uy and ran for vice governor instead. Arturo's primary opponent is former Panabo regional trial court judge Dorothy Gonzaga, wife of 2nd district congressman Ruwell Peter Gonzaga.

Davao del Norte
Governor Edwin Jubahib is going up against Davao del Norte Provincial Board member Roy Catalan.

Davao del Sur
Governor Marc Douglas Cagas IV is not running; his party nominated his wife Yvonne as their nominee. She is going up against Kiblawan mayor Carl Jason Rama and Israelito Torreon, lawyer of Apollo Quiboloy.

Davao Occidental
Governor Claude Bautista is term limited and running for congressman. He nominated his elder brother Vice Governor Franklin Bautista who is running under Lakas party.

Bautista is running unopposed.

Davao Oriental
Governor Nelson Dayanghirang is running for congressman. His party nominated congresswoman Corazon Nuñez Malanyaon as their nominee.

Malanyaon is running unopposed.

Soccksargen

Cotabato
Governor Nancy Catamco is going up against vice governor Emmylou Taliño-Mendoza.

Sarangani
Governor Steve Solon is term-limited and is vying for the congressional seat instead. His party nominated congressman Rogelio Pacquiao.

South Cotabato
Governor Reynaldo Tamayo Jr. is going up against congressman Ferdinand Hernandez.

Sultan Kudarat
Incumbent Suharto Mangudadatu is not running. Incumbent Datu Abdullah Sangki, Maguindanao mayor Datu Pax Ali Mangudadatu is his party's nominee. His opponent is Miss Asia Pacific International 2018 Sharifa Akeel, wife of incumbent Maguindanao 2nd district representative Esmael Mangudadatu. Esmael and Suharto are cousins.

On January 18, the Commission on Elections (First Division) granted two petitions for the cancellation of the certificate of candidacy of Mangudadatu, citing "material misrepresentation". On May 2, COMELEC denied the motion for reconsideration filed by Mangudadatu, upholding the earlier decision. Akeel—Mangudadatu is supposed to be the only candidate for the position.

Despite the decision, the Supreme Court issued a temporary restraining order, allowing Mangudadatu to run. He would be elected as the issue remains unresolved.

Caraga

Agusan del Norte
Governor Dale Corvera is running for congressman. His party nominated congresswoman Angelica Amante.

Agusan del Sur
Governor Santiago Cane Jr. is running unopposed.

Dinagat Islands
Governor Kaka Bag-ao is going up against vice governor Nilo Demerey Jr.

Surigao del Norte
Governor Francisco Matugas is going up against former governor Lyndon Barbers and pastor Artemio Maquiso.

Surigao del Sur
Governor Alexander Pimentel is going up against Cantilan mayor Carla Pichay.

Bangsamoro Autonomous Region in Muslim Mindanao

Basilan
Governor Hadjiman Hataman-Salliman is going up against former Basilan Provincial Board member Alfiya Akbar and retired policeman Ismael Garingan.

Lanao del Sur
Governor Mamintal Alonto Adiong Jr. is going up against former special envoy for Muslim Affairs Ameroddin Sarangani.

Maguindanao
Incumbent Governor Bai Mariam Sangki-Mangudadatu is going up against congressman Esmael Mangudadatu, who is her cousin-in-law.

Sulu
Governor Abdusakur Tan is running unopposed.

Tawi-Tawi

References

2022 Philippine local elections
2022
May 2022 events in the Philippines